Suddie is a community in the Pomeroon-Supenaam region of Guyana, located on the Atlantic Ocean, one mile north of Onderneeming.

Suddie Hospital is a small (approximately 100-bed) hospital. Rural outreach clinics are sent into the interior and along the Essequibo River from Suddie Hospital.  Suddie also has a market.  A High Court was opened in 2005.  Churches include St Anne's Anglican Church. It has a police station, post office and a cricket ground.

Anthony and Akenie Adams, cricketers, hail from Suddie.

References

Populated places in Pomeroon-Supenaam